The Pas was a provincial electoral division in the Canadian province of Manitoba. It was created in 1912 following the expansion of the province's northern border, and existed until its dissolution in 2018.  It was named for the rural city of The Pas.

Until the 1960s, elections in The Pas were deferred until a few weeks after the rest of the province for logistical reasons.  It was not unheard of for politicians from the south of the province to run in The Pas after being chosen as cabinet ministers by newly elected provincial governments; Edward Brown and John Bracken were both elected in this manner.

The Pas was located in the north of the province. It was bordered by Rupertsland to the east and south, Thompson and Flin Flon to the north, Swan River and Lake Winnipeg to the south, and the province of Saskatchewan to the west.  Besides The Pas, it also includes Easterville and Norway House.

The riding's population in 1996 was 19,449.  In 1999, the average family income was $42,878, and the unemployment rate was 17.80%.  Health and social services account for 14% of the riding's economy, with retail trade accounting for another 14%.

Sixty-seven per cent of the riding's residents are aboriginal, the second-highest rate in the province.

The Pas was represented by candidates of the New Democratic Party from 1969 onward (and for all but 11 years since 1943), and for much of that time was considered safe for the party. Its last three MLAs–Oscar Lathlin, Frank Whitehead, and Oscar's daughter Amanda Lathlin–were all aboriginal. Whitehead had previously won a by-election on March 24, 2009 following Oscar Lathlin's death. He held it until his resignation in 2014, and Amanda Lathlin won the ensuing by-election.

Following the 2018 redistribution, the riding was abolished, and its area was re-distributed into The Pas-Kameesak, Flin Flon and Keewatinook ridings. Amanda Lathlin transferred to The Pas-Kameesak.

List of provincial representatives

Electoral results

1912 by-election

1914 general election

1915 general election

1920 general election

1922 general election

1927 general election

1932 general election

1936 general election

1941 general election

1943 by-election

1945 general election

1949 general election

1953 general election

1958 general election

1959 general election

1962 general election

1966 general election

1969 general election

1973 general election

1977 general election

1981 general election

1986 general election

1988 general election

1990 general election

1995 general election

1999 general election

2003 general election

2007 general election

2009 by-election

2011 general election

2015 by-election

2016 general election

Previous boundaries

References

Former provincial electoral districts of Manitoba
The Pas